Colchester School District is a school district in Colchester, Vermont, United States.

Schools
It operates the following schools:
Colchester High School
Colchester Middle School
Malletts Bay School
Porters Point School
Union Memorial School

References

External links

Colchester, Vermont
School districts in Vermont
Education in Chittenden County, Vermont